German submarine U-255 was a Type VIIC U-boat that served in Nazi Germany's Kriegsmarine during World War II. The submarine was laid down on 21 December 1940 at the Bremer Vulkan yard at Bremen-Vegesack, launched on 8 October 1941 and commissioned on 29 November 1941 under the command of Kapitänleutnant Reinhart Reche.

One of the most successful U-boats to operate in Arctic waters, she operated from Norway during 1942–1943, and then from France in 1944–1945, sailing on 15 combat patrols, sinking ten merchant ships totalling  and damaging another of  enough for it to be written off as a total loss. She also sank the 1,200-tons  . At the end of the war U-255 surrendered to the British, and was sunk during Operation Deadlight on 13 December 1945.

Construction

U-255 was ordered by the Kriegsmarine on 23 September 1939 and laid down more than a year later on 21 December 1940 at the Bremer Vulkan yard at Bremen-Vegesack as yard number 20. U-255 was launched 8 October 1941, and commissioned on 29 November that same year with Kptlt. Reinhart Reche in command.

Design
German Type VIIC submarines were preceded by the shorter Type VIIB submarines. U-255 had a displacement of  when at the surface and  while submerged. She had two shafts and two  propellers.

U-255 was fitted with five  torpedo tubes (four fitted at the bow and one at the stern), fourteen torpedoes, one  SK C/35 naval gun, 220 rounds, and two twin  C/30 anti-aircraft guns. The boat had a complement of between forty-four and sixty.

Service history
After a period of training with the 8th U-boat Flotilla, based at Königsberg in the Baltic Sea, U-255 was transferred to the 11th U-boat Flotilla, based at Bergen, Western Norway, for front-line service on 1 July 1942.

First patrol
On 15 June 1942, U-255 sailed from Kiel, under the command of Kptlt. Reche, arriving at Narvik on the 20th. She then departed on her first patrol on 23 June, sailing into the Barents Sea, north of Russia.

The ship, en route from Baltimore to Arkhangelsk with 8,575 tons of ammunition and tanks aboard, had been a part of Convoy PQ 17 which had dispersed on Admiralty orders in the Barents Sea on 4 July. After being hit by four torpedoes, the ship broke in two, and sank within minutes. The crew abandoned ship, and one seaman fell overboard and drowned. U-255 questioned the survivors, offered food and water, gave directions to the nearest land, and left. The crew were picked up by Royal Navy ships on 9 July.

The next day, 7 July, she sank the 5,116 GRT American Hog Islander Alcoa Ranger, also from Convoy PQ 17. A single torpedo struck the ship, causing the vessel to list heavily to starboard. The crew abandoned ship in three lifeboats within 15 minutes. The crewmen were rescued by Soviet patrol boats later that day.

Early on 8 July, U-255 caught another ship from Convoy PQ 17, the 6,069 GRT American merchant ship Olopana, loaded with 6,000 tons of explosives, gasoline, and trucks as deck cargo. A single torpedo hit the ship, blowing out all the bulkheads, and killing seven of the crew. The surviving crewmen abandoned ship on four rafts, as U-255 surfaced and fired 20 shells at the ship, which sank after 20 minutes. U-255 questioned the survivors, gave them a course to land, and asked if they had enough food and water before leaving. The survivors landed at Moller Bay, Novaya Zemlya, two days later.

On 13 July U-255 found the 7,168 GRT Dutch merchant ship Paulus Potter abandoned and drifting, with 2,250 tons of general goods, ammunition, 34 tanks, 15 aircraft and 103 trucks aboard. The ship had been attacked by Ju 88 dive bombers of III./KG 30 east-north-east of Bear Island on 5 July, the day after Convoy PQ 17 dispersed. The crew had abandoned the badly damaged ship, believing it was about to sink. All 76 of the crew had taken five days to reach land at Novaya Zemlya, eventually being rescued by a Soviet whaling vessel. After finding her the II.WO and two mates from U-255 boarded the ship, and attempted to start the engines, but the engine room was flooded. They then searched the vessel, taking blankets, cigarettes, and other useful materials, including confidential documents found on the bridge, and the ship's ensign as a prize, before the ship was sunk with a single torpedo. U-255 returned to Narvik on 15 July.

Second patrol
U-255 left Narvik on 18 July 1942, arriving at Bergen on the 20th. She sailed from Bergen on 4 August for her second combat patrol, heading deep into Soviet waters, but had no success, although she shelled two Soviet wireless stations as part of Operation Wunderland, before arriving at Neidenfjord on the Norwegian/Finnish border on 9 September.

Third patrol
U-255 sailed from Neidenfjord on 13 September 1942, patrolling the Barents Sea, with no result, before heading out into the Greenland Sea. There, on 20 September, she attacked the 4,937 GRT American merchant ship Silver Sword, returning from Arkhangelsk to New York with 5,000 tons of hides and chrome ore and a deck cargo of wood pulp. Hit by two torpedoes, which blew off the stern post, propeller and rudder, and caused the after magazine to explode, the 48 crew and 16 passengers (survivors from PQ 17) abandoned ship in two lifeboats and one raft. The ship was then shelled by the W-class destroyer  and sank. The crew were later picked up by British ships, with one man dying of wounds later.

Three days later, on 23 September, U-255 was attacked by a Catalina patrol aircraft of No. 210 Squadron RAF south of Jan Mayen. After being badly damaged by two depth charges, she was forced to return to Bergen, arriving on the 25th.

Refitting and fourth patrol
On 29 September 1942 U-255 sailed from Bergen, arriving back at Kiel on 3 October. There the submarine was fitted with a Schnorchel underwater-breathing apparatus before sailing again on 7 January 1943, and arriving at Hammerfest in northern Norway on the 18th.

Returning to her old hunting grounds north of Norway, U-255 sailed from Hammerfest on 23 January 1943, and on the 26th, U-255 likely sank the 2,418 GRT Soviet merchant ship Krasnyj Partizan with two torpedoes west of Bear Island. The Russian ship had just evaded the pursuing  when it went missing. She was probably sunk by U-255 because the submarine recorded a loss the same day. After the sinking of the unknown merchant ship that was likely Krasnyj Partizan, U-255 surfaced and tried to question the survivors. They only spoke Russian and could not be understood. As a result, the crew of U-255 were unable to confirm the identity of the vessel. On 29 January, she sank another Russian freighter, the 1,892 GRT Ufa, south of Bear Island. Both Krasnyj Partizan and Ufa were loaded with timber destined for the United States, and no survivors were found from either ship unless the survivors from the unknown Russian merchant vessel that was sunk by U-255 were indeed crew members of Krasnyj Partizan.

The ship attempted to evade the attack, but was holed below the waterline, immediately flooded, and began to list to starboard. Within fifteen minutes the crew of 61 and nine passengers abandoned ship in four lifeboats. A British escort then shelled and sank the crippled ship. U-255 then arrived back at Narvik on 9 February.

Fifth patrol
U-255 sailed from Narvik on 22 February 1943 out into the northern seas once more. On 5 March she fired a spread of three torpedoes at Convoy RA 53, sailing from Murmansk to Scotland, and hit two American merchant ships; the 4,978 GRT Hog Islander Executive, loaded with 1,500 tons of potassium chloride, and the 7,191 GRT Liberty ship Richard Bland, carrying 4,000 tons of lumber.

Executive was struck on the starboard side; the explosion demolished the booms, engine, dynamos and all equipment in the immediate area. One hold rapidly flooded and the ship began to settle by the stern. Nine of the crew were killed, the remaining 53 abandoned ship in three lifeboats and a raft. The ship was sunk by gunfire from a destroyer about an hour after the attack.

Richard Bland was struck by a torpedo which did not explode, but passed through the ship, making  holes on either side. The ship remained with the convoy with only a slightly reduced speed, but on the night of 6 March lost contact in gale-force winds and rough seas, and proceeded alone towards Iceland. The crew abandoned ship, and of the total of 69 on board, the master, five officers, 13 crewmen and 15 armed guards were lost, when their lifeboats were swamped in heavy seas. The stern section was torpedoed by U-255 again and sank, but the forward section was towed to Akureyri in Iceland, where the ship was declared a total loss. U-255 then returned to Narvik, arriving on 15 March.

Sixth patrol
U-255 sailed from Narvik on 29 March 1943 to patrol the Barents Sea, but had no successes, arriving at Bergen on 29 April. On 1 June 1943, U-255 was transferred to the newly created 13th U-boat Flotilla based at the DORA 1 submarine base at Trondheim.

Seventh patrol
Under the command of Oberleutnant zur See Erich Harms (the U-boat's former I.WO) from 7 June 1943, U-255 sailed from Bergen on 9 July, arriving at Narvik on the 16th. She left Narvik on 19 July and sailed into Soviet waters, where on 27 July she sank the 411 GRT Russian survey ship Akademik Shokalskij with her deck gun and small arms fire. U-255 established a secret seaplane base on Novaya Zemlya, and returned to Narvik on 19 September after 63 days at sea.

On 1 December 1943 U-255 was transferred again, this time to the 7th U-boat Flotilla, based at Saint-Nazaire in France.

Eighth patrol
U-255 departed Bergen on 26 February 1944 sailing out into the northern Atlantic between Greenland and Iceland. The ship turned to investigate the contact, but was hit by an acoustic torpedo. The crew abandoned ship, and she sank after several hours. Only 28 survivors were picked up by her sister ship  from her crew of 199. U-255 was hunted by other escorts for three hours, but managed to slip away. On 11 April, the inbound U-boat was caught on the surface with its escort by 15 British Mosquito aircraft. These were in turn attacked by German Ju 88 aircraft. U-255 reached its new home port of St. Nazaire later that day on with only minor damage.

Ninth and tenth patrols
U-255 made two short patrols in the Bay of Biscay on the 6 – 9 May and 6 – 15 June 1944, but had no successes. U-255 began her ninth patrol on 6 May 1944 when she left St. Nazaire. However she was recalled to her home port after only 2 days fully at sea on 8 May. U-255's tenth patrol was to suffer the same fate as her ninth. She left St. Nazaire on 6 June 1944, (the day of the Normandy landings) and was recalled home on 15 June after only 10 days at sea.

11th-14th patrols
Damaged in an air raid in August 1944, U-255 was decommissioned for repairs. She was transferred back to the 13th U-boat Flotilla on 1 March 1945, and recommissioned on 2 March with Oberleutnant zur See Helmuth Heinrich in command. U-255 made a series of four short patrols between St. Nazaire and La Pallice in April and early May 1945 laying mines.

15th patrol
U-255 began her final voyage under the command of Oberleutnant zur See Helmuth Heinrich on the day of the German surrender, sailing from St. Nazaire on 8 May 1945 to Loch Alsh in Scotland, arriving there on 19 May to make her formal surrender.

Wolfpacks
U-255 took part in six wolfpacks, namely:
 Eisteufel (1 – 12 July 1942) 
 Nebelkönig (7 – 9 August 1942) 
 Nordwind (24 January - 4 February 1943) 
 Taifun (2 – 4 April 1943) 
 Eisbär (4 – 15 April 1943) 
 Preussen (9 – 22 March 1944)

Fate
U-255 was transferred to Loch Eriboll, and then Loch Ryan on 19 May 1945 for "Operation Deadlight".

Summary of raiding history

See also
 German U-boat bases in occupied Norway

References

Notes

Citations

Bibliography

External links
 

 Loss of the USS Leopold, 9 March 1944

World War II submarines of Germany
German Type VIIC submarines
U-boats commissioned in 1941
Novaya Zemlya
Operation Deadlight
Ships built in Bremen (state)
Shipwrecks of Ireland
U-boats sunk in 1945
U-boats sunk by British aircraft
Maritime incidents in December 1945
Submarines sunk by aircraft as targets